The Health and Social Care Act 2008 (c 14) is an Act of the Parliament of the United Kingdom.

Synopsis
The Act was created on 11 March 2009 with the following regulated activities:
 provision of health care to patients by a National Health Service (NHS) Trust or NHS Foundation Trust.
 provision of ambulance services, for transporting patients for the purpose of treatment by a NHS Trust or a NHS Foundation Trust.
 provision of health care to patients by a Primary Care Trust.
 management of NHS Blood and Transplant, including: supply of blood, supply of stem cells and bone marrow, supply of tissues for transplant or grafting and also the Donor Organs including the matching and allocation.

The Care Quality Commission has the responsibilities to ensure service providers are providing quality care when carrying on the regulated activities.

The Act makes further substantial revisions and repeals to the Public Health (Control of Disease) Act 1984, by section 129, and Schedule 11. These have the effect of repealing, and replacing most of the provisions of Part 2 of the 1984 Act.

In summer 2021, it was proposed by the Second Johnson ministry to mandate that care home staff be required as a condition of employment to maintain COVID-19 vaccination status. On 13 July the House of Lords had poignant questions for Nadhim Zahawi MP, at the time the Minister for Business and Industry and also the Minister for COVID Vaccine Deployment at the DHSC. It was unclear to certain members of the Secondary Legislation Scrutiny Committee just why and on what basis the Health and Social Care Act 2008 (Regulated Activities) (Amendment) (Coronavirus) Regulations 2021 proposed to regulate. Lord German said "we have consistently made clear our view that all key definitions and criteria on which decisions that might affect a person’s welfare or livelihood will be made, should be included in legislation and not in guidance which cannot be subjected to appropriate Parliamentary scrutiny or approval."

Delegated legislation

Section 170 – Commencement Orders
Orders made under section 170(3) include:
The Health and Social Care Act 2008 (Commencement No. 1) Order 2008 (S.I. 2008/2214 (C.100))
The Health and Social Care Act 2008 (Commencement No. 2) Order 2008 (S.I. 2008/2497 (C.106))
The Health and Social Care Act 2008 (Commencement No. 3) Order 2008 (S.I. 2008/2717 (C.120))
The Health and Social Care Act 2008 (Commencement No. 4) Order 2008 (S.I. 2008/2994 (C.129))
The Health and Social Care Act 2008 (Commencement No. 5) Order 2008 (S.I. 2008/3137 (C.136))
The Health and Social Care Act 2008 (Commencement No. 6, Transitory and Transitional Provisions) Order 2008 (S.I. 2008/3168 (C.143))
The Health and Social Care Act 2008 (Commencement No. 7) Order 2008 (S.I. 2008/3244 (C.148))
The Health and Social Care Act 2008 (Commencement No. 8) Order 2009 (S.I. 2009/270 (C.12))
The Health and Social Care Act 2008 (Commencement No. 9, Consequential Amendments and Transitory, Transitional and Saving Provisions) Order 2009 (S.I. 2009/462 (C.31))
The Health and Social Care Act 2008 (Commencement No. 9, Consequential Amendments and Transitory, Transitional and Saving Provisions) Amendment Order 2009 (S.I. 2009/580 (C.40))
The Health and Social Care Act 2008 (Commencement No. 10) Order 2009 (S.I. 2009/1310 (C.71))
The Health and Social Care Act 2008 (Commencement No. 11) Order 2009 (S.I. 2009/2567 (C.109))
The Health and Social Care Act 2008 (Commencement No. 12) Order 2009 (S.I. 2009/2862 (C.126))
The Health and Social Care Act 2008 (Commencement No. 13, Transitory and Transitional Provisions and Electronic Communications) Order 2009 (S.I. 2009/3023 (C.130))
The Health and Social Care Act 2008 (Commencement No.13, Transitory and Transitional Provisions and Electronic Communications) Amendment Order 2010 (S.I. 2010/47)
The Health and Social Care Act 2008 (Commencement No. 14) Order 2010 (S.I. 2010/23 (C.3))
The Health and Social Care Act 2008 (Commencement No. 15, Consequential Amendments and Transitional and Savings Provisions) Order 2010 (S.I. 2010/708 (C.46))
The Health and Social Care Act 2008 (Commencement No.16, Transitory and Transitional Provisions) Order 2010 (S.I. 2010/807 (C.53))
The Health and Social Care Act 2008 (Commencement No. 17) Order 2011 (S.I. 2011/986 (W.143) (C.39))
The Health and Social Care Act 2008 (Commencement No. 1) (Wales) Order 2009 (S.I. 2009/631 (W.57))
The Health and Social Care Act 2008 (Commencement No. 2 and Transitional Provisions) (Wales) Order 2010 (S.I. 2010/989 (W.98) (C.67))
The Health and Social Care Act 2008 (Commencement No. 3) (Wales) Order 2010 (S.I. 2010/1457 (W.130) (C.83))
The Health and Social Care Act 2008 (Commencement No. 4, Transitional and Savings Provisions) (Wales) Order 2010 (S.I. 2010/1547 (W.145) (C.84))

References
Halsbury's Statutes,

External links
The Health and Social Care Act 2008, as amended from the National Archives.
The Health and Social Care Act 2008, as originally enacted from the National Archives.
Explanatory notes to the Health and Social Care Act 2008.

United Kingdom Acts of Parliament 2008
Social care in England
NHS legislation